List of Afghan Rulers in present-day Afghanistan with capital at Kandahar     

Kandahar
Afghanistan-related lists